Attica is a 2021 American documentary film by Stanley Nelson and Traci Curry. It premiered at the 2021 Toronto International Film Festival on September 9, 2021 and aired on Showtime on October 29, 2021.

Summary
The film is a 50-year look back at the 1971 Attica uprising through interviews with the mostly black and Latino inmates who were there.

Reception

Accolades

References

External links

Official trailer
Official website

Documentary films about racism in the United States
2021 documentary films
2021 films
American documentary films
African-American films
Showtime (TV network) documentary films
Attica Correctional Facility
Documentary films about incarceration in the United States
2020s English-language films
2020s American films